Cariboo River Provincial Park is a provincial park in British Columbia, Canada, located between Barkerville and Likely in the upper Cariboo River basin.

Located between Kimball Lake and Cariboo Lake, the park was established in 1995, comprising 3212 hectares.  Its boundaries were revised in 2010, the total area now being 3211 hectares.

References

Provincial parks of British Columbia
Cariboo Mountains
Geography of the Cariboo
1995 establishments in British Columbia
Protected areas established in 1995